Sophie Hughes (born 1986) is a British literary translator who works chiefly from Spanish to English.

She is known for her translations of contemporary writers such as Laia Jufresa, Rodrigo Hasbún, Alia Trabucco Zerán and Fernanda Melchor. Her works have been shortlisted for the International Dublin Literary Award, International Booker Prize, Man Booker International Prize, along with other awards.

Personal life
Hughes was born in Chertsey, England in June 1986 and currently lives in Birmingham.

Education
Hughes received a master's degree in Comparative Literature from University College London in 2011.

Career
Following graduation from University College London, Hughes moved to Mexico City and began working as Asymptote's editor-at-large. During this time, she also served as a guest editor for Words Without Borders. She also translated journalistic work about Mexico for English PEN and the Guardian, as well as a section of the essay collection The Sorrows of Mexico. Hughes has also worked as a translation correspondent for Dazed & Confused.

Hughes' first published book was a translation of Iván Repila’s The Boy Who Stole Attila’s Horse, published in 2015.

She is interested in co-translation and has worked with Amanda Hopkinson, Margaret Jull Costa, and Juana Adcock.

Selected translated works

Books 
 Paradais by Fernanda Melchor (2022)
 When Women Kill: Four Crimes Retold by Alia Trabucco Zeran (2022)
 Empty Houses by Brenda Navarro (2020)
 Hurricane Season by Fernanda Melchor (2020)
The Sorrows of Mexico by Lydia Cacho et al. (contributor)(2020)
 Mac and His Problem by Enrique Vila-Matas (with Margaret Jull Costa) (2019)
An Orphan World by Giuseppe Caputo (with Juana Adcock) (2019)
 The Hole by José Revueltas (with Amanda Hopkinson)(2018)
The Remainder by Alia Trabucco Zerán (2018)
 Affections by Rodrigo Hasbún (2017)
Still the Same Man by Jon Bilbao (2016)
 The Boy Who Stole Attila's Horse by Iván Repila (2015)
Umami by Laia Jufresa (2015)

Essays 

 "I Am Not Your Cholo" by Marco Avilés, in Words Without Borders (2017)
 "Señor Socket and the Señora from the Café" by Julio Villanueva Chang, in Words Without Borders (2017)

Short stories 

 "The Cornerist" by Laia Jufresa, in Words Without Borders (2015) 
 "Long Distance" by Rodrigo Hasbún, in Words Without Borders (2015)
 "Mexico Interrupted" with Thomas Bunstead, in Words Without Borders (2015)
 "An Orphan World" by Giuseppe Caputo, in Words Without Borders (2017)
 "A Bitter Pill" by Alia Trabucco Zerán, in Words Without Borders (2019)

Awards and honours

References

Spanish–English translators
Living people
1986 births
Alumni of University College London